The Apprentice 2 can refer to:

The Apprentice (UK Series Two)
The Apprentice (American season 2)